The Hungry Valley Formation is a geologic formation in the San Emigdio Mountains — near Gorman in northeastern Los Angeles County, California.

It preserves fossils dating back to the Neogene period.

See also

 
 List of fossiliferous stratigraphic units in California
 Paleontology in California

References

 

Geology of Los Angeles County, California
Neogene California
San Emigdio Mountains